The 1995 Nokia Open was a tennis tournament played on indoor hard courts in Beijing, China that was part of the World Series of the 1995 ATP Tour and of Tier IV of the 1995 WTA Tour. The men's tournament was held from October 16 through October 22, 1995, while the women's tournament was held from September 25 through October 1, 1995.

Finals

Men's singles

 Michael Chang defeated  Renzo Furlan 7–5, 6–3
 It was Chang's 4th title of the year and the 23rd of his career.

Women's singles

 Linda Wild defeated  Shi-Ting Wang 7–5, 6–2
 It was Wild's 3rd title of the year and the 7th of her career.

Men's doubles

 Tommy Ho /  Sébastien Lareau defeated  Dick Norman /  Fernon Wibier 7–6, 7–6
 It was Ho's 3rd title of the year and the 4th of his career. It was Lareau's 2nd career title.

Women's doubles

 Claudia Porwik /  Linda Wild defeated  Stephanie Rottier /  Shi-Ting Wang 6–1, 6–0
 It was Porwik's 2nd title of the year and the 6th of her career. It was Wild's 4th title of the year and the 8th of her career.

External links
 ATP Tournament Profile
Men's Singles Draw
Men's Doubles Draw
 WTA Tournament Profile
Women's Singles and Doubles Draw

Nokia Open
Nokia Open
China Open (tennis)
1995 in Chinese tennis